Alexander John Forbes-Leith, 1st Baron Leith of Fyvie JP, DL (6 August 1847 – 14 November 1925), was a Scottish Royal Navy officer and US steel magnate.

Background and education
Born at Aberdeen, Alexander Leith was the youngest son of Rear-Admiral John James Leith and his wife Margaret Forbes, daughter and heiress of Alexander Forbes, a descendant of Duncan Forbes, second son of the second Lord Forbes. He was the grandson of General Alexander Leith Hay and the nephew of Sir Andrew Leith Hay. He was educated at Berlin, Prussia, the École spéciale militaire de Saint-Cyr and Dr. Burney's Naval Academy at Gosport, Hampshire. He later assumed the additional surname of Forbes.

Naval career
Forbes-Leith joined the Royal Navy in 1860 with the rank of naval cadet. He was rated midshipman in 1861 and fought in the New Zealand Wars between 1864 and 1865. During his time in the Royal Navy he was awarded the Royal Humane Society Medal for saving a boy from drowning. He became a lieutenant in 1869 but retired from the service in 1872.

Business career

Forbes-Leith married the daughter of a director of an Illinois steel mill in 1871 (see below). He worked his way up in to become president of the Joliet Iron and Steel Company, which later merged into Illinois Steel and eventually the United States Steel Corporation, of which Leith became a director. He was also a partner in a merchant bank.

In 1889, Forbes-Leith used the fortune he had made in the steel industry to acquire Fyvie Castle in Aberdeenshire for £175,000 and invested large sums in its restoration. He was also a Justice of the Peace and Deputy Lieutenant of Aberdeenshire. In 1905 he was raised to the peerage as Baron Leith of Fyvie, of Fyvie in the County of Aberdeen.

Family

Lord Leith of Fyvie married Marie Louise January, daughter of Derick Algernon January, of St Louis, Missouri. They had one son and two daughters (of which the youngest died as an infant). His only son Percy Forbes-Leith died while serving in the Second Boer War. Leith died at Hartwell House, Buckinghamshire, in November 1925, aged 78, and was cremated at Golders Green Crematorium. The barony died with him. Lady Leith of Fyvie died at Hartwell House in June 1930, aged 82. Lord Leith's estates, including Fyvie Castle, passed to his daughter and only surviving child, the Honourable Ethel, wife of the former Conservative Member of Parliament Sir Charles Rosdew Burn, 1st Baronet. In 1925, the latter assumed the surname and arms of Forbes-Leith of Fyvie, for himself, his wife and son, according to the terms of his father-in-law's will (see Forbes baronets for more information on the baronetcy).

References

External links

1847 births
1925 deaths
Barons in the Peerage of the United Kingdom
Deputy Lieutenants of Aberdeenshire
People educated at Burney's Academy
Peers created by Edward VII